Olavanna is a census town in Kozhikode district in the Indian state of Kerala.
Olavanna is the most populous panchayat in kerala. It is located 10 km from Kozhikode City. Olavanna panchayath shares the border with Kozhikode corporation and Perumanna panchayath. At first it was a large agricultural area. Today there are many small and large scale industries. There are also small marketplaces such as the Pantheerankavu, Olavanna Chungam, Kodinattumukku, Mathara, Palazhi, Kunnathupalam, Iringallor. The railway station is around 10 kilometres away and the nearest airport is Calicut international Airport. HiLite Mall is located in Palazhi junction.

Olavanna is a part of the Kozhikode urban area master plan.

Demographics
 India census, Olavanna had a population of 30,927. Males constitute 49% of the population and females 51%. Olavanna has an average literacy rate of 83%, higher than the national average of 59.5%: male literacy is 85%, and female literacy is 80%. In Olavanna, 12% of the population is under 6 years of age.

Pantheeramkavu junction
The bypass road from Ramanattukara to Vengalam has increased the importance of Olavanna because the Pantheeramkavu junction is part of the panchayath jurisdiction.  The junction has become a commercial hub with many hospitals and shopping malls cropping up around the junction.

References

Kozhikode south